Tommaso Traversa (born 4 August 1990) is an Italian ice hockey player for Alps Hockey League (AlpsHL) side SG Cortina and the Italian national team.

He participated at the 2017 IIHF World Championship.

References

External links

1990 births
Living people
Italian ice hockey forwards
Sportspeople from Turin
Italian expatriate ice hockey people
Italian expatriate sportspeople in Scotland
Italian expatriate sportspeople in the United States
Ritten Sport players
HC Valpellice players
Dundee Stars players
Alaska Aces (ECHL) players
HC Pustertal Wölfe players
SG Cortina players
Sheffield Steelers players
Hobart and William Smith Colleges alumni
Italian expatriate sportspeople in Slovakia
Expatriate ice hockey players in Scotland
Expatriate ice hockey players in the United States
Expatriate ice hockey players in Slovakia
Italian expatriate sportspeople in England
Expatriate ice hockey players in England